Kim Hyeon-woo (Hangul: 김현우, ; born November 6, 1988 in Wonju, Gangwon-do) is a male wrestler from South Korea. In the 2012 Summer Olympics, Kim won the gold medal in the 66 kg Greco-Roman wrestling final.

Biography
Kim began to train judo at the age of 9. However he converted his sport into wrestling in 2001.

Kim first drew international attention in 2006 when he won the silver medal at the World Junior Wrestling Championships and the gold medal at the Asian Junior Wrestling Championships. Kim became a member of the South Korean senior national team in 2010 when he won the gold medal at the Asian Wrestling Championships.

At the 2011 World Wrestling Championships, Kim won bronze for his first medal at a major competition. In the quarterfinal bout, he beat 2008 Olympic silver medalist Vitaliy Rahimov of Azerbaijan 2–0. In December 2011, Kim won the gold medal in the men's Greco-Roman 66 kg at the Pre-London Olympics Test Event.

At the 2012 Olympics, Kim edged out defending Olympic champion Steeve Guenot of France 2–1 in the semifinals. In the final, Kim beat Tamás Lőrincz of Hungary with 2-0 (1:0, 2:0) to give South Korea its first wrestling gold of the London Games.

At the 2016 Summer Olympics, Kim was defeated by Roman Vlasov of Russia in the round of 16 in the 75 kg division. He then defeated Yang Bin of China during the repechages and Božo Starčević of Croatia to win the bronze medal. He was the flag bearer for South Korea during the closing ceremony.

He competed in the 77kg event at the 2022 World Wrestling Championships held in Belgrade, Serbia.

References

External links
 Kim Hyeon-woo at BBC Sport
 Kim Hyeon-woo at NBC Olympics
 

Living people
1988 births
Olympic gold medalists for South Korea
Olympic bronze medalists for South Korea
Olympic wrestlers of South Korea
Olympic medalists in wrestling
Wrestlers at the 2012 Summer Olympics
Wrestlers at the 2016 Summer Olympics
Wrestlers at the 2010 Asian Games
Medalists at the 2012 Summer Olympics
Medalists at the 2016 Summer Olympics
Wrestlers at the 2014 Asian Games
Medalists at the 2014 Asian Games
Wrestlers at the 2018 Asian Games
Medalists at the 2018 Asian Games
Asian Games medalists in wrestling
World Wrestling Championships medalists
South Korean male sport wrestlers
Asian Games gold medalists for South Korea
Asian Games bronze medalists for South Korea
South Korean Buddhists
People from Wonju
Sportspeople from Gangwon Province, South Korea
21st-century South Korean people